Philotheca scabra is a species of flowering plant in the family Rutaceae and is endemic to New South Wales. It is a small shrub with variably shaped leaves, depending on subspecies, and single white to pink flowers arranged on the ends of branchlets.

Description

Taxonomy
This philotheca was first formally described in 1844 by Joseph Paxton who gave it the name Eriostemon scaber and published the description in Paxton's Magazine of Botany from a specimen "in the nursery of Messrs. Henderson, of Pine Apple Place, who received it from the gardens of Baron Hugel, at Vienna, about twelve months back". In 1970, Paul G. Wilson described two subspecies of Eriostemon scaber in the journal Nuytsia:
 Eriostemon scaber  (Paul G.Wilson) Paul G.Wilson subsp. scaber that has smooth stems and more or less cylindrical leaves.

In 1998, Wilson changed the species name to Philotheca scabra and the subspecies to P. scabra subsp. latifolia and P. scabra subsp. scabra respectively, in a later edition of the same journal: The names of the subspecies are accepted by the Australian Plant Census:
 Philotheca scabra subsp. latifolia  (Paul G.Wilson) Paul G.Wilson;
 Philotheca scabra  (Paul G.Wilson) Paul G.Wilson subsp. scabra.

Distribution and habitat
Philotheca scabra grows in heath and forest on the coast and nearby ranges of New South Wales between Sydney and the Nerriga and Nowra districts. Subspecies scaber occurs in the northern part of the species' distribution and subsp. latifolius near Nerriga and Nowra.

References

scabra
Flora of New South Wales
Sapindales of Australia
Plants described in 1844
Taxa named by Joseph Paxton
Taxa named by Paul G. Wilson